Takhteh Sang-e Olya (also Romanized as Takhteh Sang-e ‘Olyā; also known as Takhteh Sang, Takht-e Sang, and Takht-i-Sang) is a village in Banesh Rural District, Beyza District, Sepidan County, Fars Province, Iran. At the 2006 census, its population was 283, in 54 families.

References 

Populated places in Beyza County